Atrophaneura semperi is a species of butterfly from the family Papilionidae that is found in Indonesia, Malaysia, and the Philippines. It is the type species for the genus.

The wingspan is 12–15 cm. The wings are black. The body has red hairs. The underside of the hindwings contain some red markings. Females are dark brown with light pink markings on the upside of the wings.

The larvae feed on Aristolochia species.

Subspecies

Atrophaneura semperi semperi (Philippines: Camiguin de Luzon, Polillo)
Atrophaneura semperi aphthonia (Rothschild, 1908) (Philippines: Camiguin de Mindanao, Dinagar, Mindanao, Siargao)
Atrophaneura semperi melanotus (Staudinger, 1889) (Philippines: Palawan, Calamian group)
Atrophaneura semperi albofasciata (Semper, 1892) (Philippines: Mindoro)
Atrophaneura semperi supernotatus (Rothschild, 1895) (Philippines: Bohol, Cebu, Leyte, Panaon, Samar)
Atrophaneura semperi baglantis (Rothschild, 1908) (Philippines: Negros)
Atrophaneura semperi imogene Schröder & Treadaway, 1979 (Philippines: Sibuyan)
Atrophaneura semperi lizae Schröder & Treadaway, 1984 (Philippines: Panay)
Atrophaneura semperi sorsogona Page & Treadaway, 1996 (Philippines: south-eastern Luzon)
Atrophaneura semperi justini Page & Treadaway, 2003 (Philippines: Masbate)

See also
Ecoregions in the Philippines

References

Page M. G.P & Treadaway,C. G. 2003 Schmetterlinge der Erde, Butterflies of the World Part XVII (17), Papilionidae IX Papilionidae of the Philippine Islands. Edited by Erich Bauer and Thomas Frankenbach Keltern: Goecke & Evers; Canterbury: Hillside Books. 

Butterflies described in 1861
Atrophaneura
Butterflies of Indonesia
Butterflies of Asia
Taxa named by Baron Cajetan von Felder
Taxa named by Rudolf Felder